The 1929 Southern Conference men's basketball tournament took place from March 1–March 4, 1929, at Municipal Auditorium in Atlanta, Georgia. The NC State Wolfpack won their first Southern Conference title, led by head coach Gus Tebell.

Bracket

* Overtime game

Championship

All-Southern tournament team

See also
List of Southern Conference men's basketball champions

References

Tournament
Southern Conference men's basketball tournament
Southern Conference men's basketball tournament
Southern Conference men's basketball tournament